Major-General Arthur William Purser  (21 September 1884 – 21 December 1953) was a British Army officer.

Military career
Educated at Marlborough College and the Royal Military Academy, Woolwich, Purser was commissioned into the Royal Field Artillery on 15 July 1903 and saw service in France during the First World War, where he was awarded the Military Cross in 1917 while serving as an adjutant to a RFA brigade.

Remaining in the army during the interwar period and, after serving for several years at the Royal School of Artillery, Larkhill, Purser became commander of the 1st Heavy Brigade, Royal Artillery in 1931, an instructor at the Senior Officers' School, Sheerness in 1935 and Brigadier, Royal Artillery at Eastern Command in 1937. The following year saw him promoted to the rank of major-general.

In September 1939, the month the Second World War began, he went on to be General Officer Commanding (GOC) of the newly raised 66th Infantry Division, a Territorial Army (TA) formation. His command of the division was destined to be short-lived, however, as ill-health forced him into retirement from the army, after more than thirty-six years of service, in January 1940, with Alan Cunningham succeeding him in command of the 66th Division.

References

Bibliography

External links
Generals of World War II

1884 births
1953 deaths
Officers of the Order of the British Empire
Recipients of the Military Cross
Royal Field Artillery officers
British Army generals of World War II
British Army personnel of World War I
Graduates of the Royal Military Academy, Woolwich
People educated at Marlborough College
British Army major generals